Qarah Chaman Rural District is a rural district (dehestan) in Arzhan District, Shiraz County, Fars Province, Iran. At the 2006 census, its population was 9,231, in 2,034 families.  The rural district has 32 villages.

References 

Rural Districts of Fars Province
Shiraz County